Omar El Akkad (born 1982) is an Egyptian-Canadian novelist and journalist, whose novel What Strange Paradise was the winner of the 2021 Giller Prize.

Early life and education 
Omar El Akkad was born in Cairo, Egypt, and grew up in Doha, Qatar. When he was 16 years old, he moved to Canada, completing high school in Montreal and university at Queen's University in Kingston, Ontario. He has a computer science degree.

Career 
For ten years he was a staff reporter for The Globe and Mail, where he covered the war in Afghanistan, military trials at Guantanamo Bay and the Arab Spring in Egypt. He was most recently a correspondent for the western United States, where he covered Black Lives Matter.

His first novel, American War, was published in 2017. It received positive reviews from critics; The New York Times book critic Michiko Kakutani compared it favourably to Cormac McCarthy's The Road and Philip Roth's novel The Plot Against America. She wrote that "melodramatic" dialogue could be forgiven by the use of details that makes the fictional future "seem alarmingly real". The Globe and Mail called it "a masterful debut." The novel was named a shortlisted finalist for the 2017 Rogers Writers' Trust Fiction Prize, and for the 2018 amazon.ca First Novel Award, and won a Kobo Emerging Writer Prize.

In November 2019 BBC News listed American War on a list of the 100 most influential novels.

In 2021, El-Akkad appeared on the podcast Storybound.

On November 8, 2021, El-Akkad won the Giller Prize for What Strange Paradise. The novel was selected for the 2022 edition of Canada Reads, where it will be defended by Tareq Hadhad.

In 2022, Omar Ek-Akkad appeared on the podcast, The Literary City with Ramjee Chandran to talk about "What Strange Paradise."

Personal life 
He lives with his wife and daughter in Portland, Oregon.

Bibliography 
 American War - 2017 (New York: Alfred A. Knopf)
 What Strange Paradise - 2021 (Toronto: McClelland & Stewart)

References 

1982 births
Living people
21st-century Canadian male writers
21st-century Canadian novelists
Canadian male journalists
Canadian male novelists
Canadian people of Egyptian descent
Journalists from Portland, Oregon
People from Doha